In Greek mythology, Pero (/ˈpɪroʊ, ˈpiːroʊ/; Ancient Greek: Πηρώ) may refer to the following women:

 Pero, consort of Poseidon who became the mother of Asopus, according to Acusilaus. She may be the same with Celusa, possible mother of Asopus by the same god.
 Pero, the beautiful daughter of Neleus.
Pero, also known as Xanthippe, daughter of Myconus.

Notes

References 

 Apollodorus, The Library with an English Translation by Sir James George Frazer, F.B.A., F.R.S. in 2 Volumes, Cambridge, MA, Harvard University Press; London, William Heinemann Ltd. 1921. . Online version at the Perseus Digital Library. Greek text available from the same website.
Pausanias, Description of Greece with an English Translation by W.H.S. Jones, Litt.D., and H.A. Ormerod, M.A., in 4 Volumes. Cambridge, MA, Harvard University Press; London, William Heinemann Ltd. 1918. . Online version at the Perseus Digital Library
Pausanias, Graeciae Descriptio. 3 vols. Leipzig, Teubner. 1903.  Greek text available at the Perseus Digital Library.

Women of Poseidon
Women in Greek mythology